The red saddleback anemonefish, Amphiprion ephippium, also known as the saddle anemonefish, is a  marine fish belonging to the family Pomacentridae, the clownfishes and damselfishes.

Characteristics of Anemonefish  

Clownfish or anemonefish are  fishes  that, in the wild, form symbiotic mutualisms with sea anemones and are unaffected by the stinging tentacles of the host anemone, see .  The sea anemone protects the clownfish from predators, as well as providing food through the scraps left from the anemone's meals and occasional dead anemone tentacles. In return, the clownfish defends the anemone from its predators, and parasites. Clownfish are small-sized, and depending on species, they are overall yellow, orange, or a reddish or blackish color, and many show white bars or patches. Within species there may be color variations, most commonly according to distribution, but also based on sex, age and host anemone.  Clownfish are found in warmer waters of the Indian and Pacific oceans and the Red Sea in sheltered reefs or in shallow lagoons.

In a group of clownfish, there is a strict dominance hierarchy. The largest and most aggressive fish is female and is found at the top. Only two clownfish, a male and a female, in a group reproduce through external fertilization. Clownfish are sequential hermaphrodites, meaning that they develop into males first, and when they mature, they become females.

Description
Adults, as the common name suggests, have a reddish-orange body and a black saddle or spot on the sides. While small juveniles may have 2 or 3 white bars, these are not present in mature fish. They have 10-11 dorsal spines, 2 anal spines,  16-18 dorsal soft rays and 13-14 anal soft rays.

Color variations
None known.

Similar species
The lack of a white head bar on adults distinguishes A. ephippium from the somewhat similar A. frenatus, A. melanopus, and A. rubrocinctus.

Distribution and Habitat
A. ephippium is found  in the Andaman and Nicobar Islands, Thailand, Malaysia, Sumatra, and Java. The original collection locality, Tranquebar is believed to be erroneous as it is outside the known range.

Host anemones
A. ephippium is associated with the following species of anemones:

Entacmaea quadricolor Bubble-tip anemone
Heteractis crispa Sebae anemone

References

External links
 

Amphiprion
Fish described in 1790